Barbara K. Emary (1908–1995) was a British screenwriter and film producer. She worked frequently with the director John Baxter.

Selected filmography

Producer
 Fortune Lane (1947)
 Nothing Venture (1948)
 The Second Mate (1950)
 Judgment Deferred (1952)
 You're Only Young Twice (1952)
 Ramsbottom Rides Again (1956)
 Make Mine a Million (1959)

Screenwriter
 Stepping Toes (1938)
 Old Mother Riley in Society (1940)
 Love on the Dole (1941)
 Old Mother Riley in Business (1941)
 Crook's Tour (1941)
 Old Mother Riley's Circus (1941)
 The Common Touch (1941)
 Let the People Sing (1942)
 We'll Smile Again (1942)
 When We Are Married (1943)
 Old Mother Riley Detective (1943)
 The Grand Escapade (1947)

Production manager
 The Shipbuilders (1943)
 Candles at Nine (1944)
 Laxdale Hall (1953)

References

Bibliography
 Brian McFarlane. Lance Comfort. Manchester University Press, 1999.

External links

1908 births
1995 deaths
People from Wimbledon, London
British film producers
20th-century British screenwriters
20th-century British businesspeople